Yu Jianhua (born December 1961) is a Chinese politician and diplomat who is the current head of the General Administration of Customs.

Biography
Yu was born in Yancheng County (now Yancheng), Jiangsu, in December 1961. He studied at Wuyou High School, and in 1978, he was accepted to Yancheng Teachers University, majoring in the Department of Foreign Languages. After graduation, he taught at the university. In 1988, he became a graduate student at the China Foreign Affairs University. He joined the Chinese Communist Party in June 1991.

After graduation, he was assigned to the Ministry of Economy and Trade (later reshuffled as Ministry of Commerce), where he was promoted to assistant minister in January 2011. In October 2013, he was appointed permanent representative of China to the World Trade Organization, a position he held until February 2017, when he was promoted to vice minister of Commerce and deputy representative for international trade negotiations. In December 2017, he was made ambassador of the permanent mission of China to the United Nations Office at Geneva and Other International Organizations in Switzerland, but only held the position for a year and a half. In April 2019, he was recalled to be vice minister of Commerce and deputy representative for international trade negotiations. In January 2021, he rose to become representative for international trade negotiations, although he remained a vice minister of Commerce.

In April 2022, he took office as head of the General Administration of Customs, succeeding Ni Yuefeng.

References

1961 births
Living people
People from Yancheng
China Foreign Affairs University alumni
People's Republic of China politicians from Jiangsu
Chinese Communist Party politicians from Jiangsu